Catch! is the first studio album by Japanese singer Tsuji Shion.

Track listing

References

2010 debut albums
Shion Tsuji albums